Charles Malik Whitfield (born August 1, 1972) is an American actor. He is best known for his performance as Otis Williams in the television miniseries, The Temptations (1998), for which he was nominated for a NAACP Image Award for Outstanding Actor in a Television Movie or Mini-Series.

Life and career 
Whitfield was born in the Bronx, New York. Beginning his career in 1992, he played, from 1993 to 1994, Ben Price on the ABC daytime soap opera, One Life to Live. He later appeared in films Fresh and Bleeding Hearts.
Whitfield is best known for his role as Otis Williams in the 1998 miniseries The Temptations.

From 2001 to 2003 he starred as James Mooney in the CBS legal drama series, The Guardian. Whitfield later guest-starred on CSI: Miami, Castle, The Game, Private Practice, White Collar, Rizzoli & Isles, Body of Proof, Law & Order: Special Victims Unit, The Good Wife, and Scorpion. He also had the recurring role of Agent Henriksen in The CW series Supernatural from 2007 to 2008, and co-starred in the number of television pilots. Whitfield also featured in Ubisoft's first-person shooter, Far Cry 3 as Dennis who helps Jason Brody throughout the game.

In 2014, Whitfield began starring as April Parker Jones' character's love interest in the Oprah Winfrey Network series If Loving You Is Wrong.

In 2016 he appeared in 2 episodes of the sixth season of the anthological series American Horror Story, portraying Mason Harris.

In 2019, he appears on a new Bounce TV original sitcom titled Last Call, starring in the lead role as Darius Knight.

Filmography

Film

Television

Video Games

Awards and nominations

References

External links 

1972 births
Living people
African-American male actors
American male television actors
American male film actors
People from the Bronx
Male actors from New York City
20th-century American male actors
21st-century American male actors
20th-century African-American people
21st-century African-American people